The 2013 South American Aerobic Gymnastics Championships were held in Cali, Colombia, July 27–30, 2013. The competition was organized by the Colombian Gymnastics Federation, and approved by the International Gymnastics Federation.

Participating countries

Medalists

References

2013 in gymnastics
International sports competitions hosted by Colombia
2013 in Colombian sport
2013